In 2003 there were two special elections to the United States House of Representatives in the 108th United States Congress.

List of elections 
Elections are listed by date and district.

Hawaii's 2nd congressional district

Texas's 19th congressional district

See also 
 List of special elections to the United States House of Representatives

References 

 
2003